Yoo Young-jin is a South Korean singer-songwriter, record producer and vocal trainer under SM Entertainment. He has produced and written songs for H.O.T., S.E.S, BoA, Shinhwa, TVXQ, CSJH The Grace, Super Junior, Girls' Generation, Shinee, f(x), EXO, Red Velvet, NCT and aespa.

Biography
Yoo Young-jin was born in Gochang, South Korea on April 10, 1971. He has two younger brothers and sisters. He was a graduate from Jeonju High School.

Career
He started his singing career in 1995. He released a solo album entitled Agape (2001), which is composed of 15 tracks featuring different artists under SM Entertainment.

On March 15, 2023, it was reported that Young-jin had officially left SM after 28 years under the company, as a result of the company's management transition.

Music discography
Studio albums
 Blues in Rhythm Album (August 1993)
 Blue Rhythm (September 1995)
 ...지애(之愛) (Agape) (March 2001)

Collaboration singles
 Tell Me (What Is Love) by Yoo Young-jin x D.O., released on February 9, 2016 
 Cure by Yoo Young-jin x Taeyong, released on August 5, 2017

Production discography

Writer-producer
 September 2009: "Super Girl" – Super Girl by Super Junior-M
 December 2010: "Beautiful Girls" (bonus track) – Into the New World by Girls' Generation
November 2020: "Black Mamba" by Aespa

Compositions

Lyrics

Arrangements

References

SM Entertainment people
English-language singers from South Korea
K-pop singers
South Korean pop singers
South Korean rhythm and blues singers
South Korean electronic musicians
South Korean dance musicians
South Korean singer-songwriters
South Korean record producers
1971 births
Living people
21st-century South Korean singers